David Viviano (born December 8, 1971) is a justice of the Michigan Supreme Court, appointed by Governor Rick Snyder on February 28, 2013, to fill the vacancy created by the resignation of Justice Diane Hathaway. Prior to his appointment to the Michigan Supreme Court, Justice Viviano was the Chief Judge of the Macomb County Circuit Court.

Viviano defeated Deborah Thomas and Kerry L. Morgan in the general election on November 4, 2014, receiving 62.1 percent of the vote.

Early life and education
Justice Viviano earned a bachelor's degree from Hillsdale College and his J.D degree from the University of Michigan Law School.

Notable decisions
In 2022, Viviano, joined by one other justice, dissented from a decision of the Michigan Supreme Court ordering the Board of State Canvassers to allow a ballot proposition that would amend the Michigan Constitution to provide for a right to abortion before viability with limitations afterward. Viviano claimed that the proposed amendment did not comply with Michigan's "full text" requirement for ballot propositions because, while the full text may have been present, the text used different "spaces" than those found in the Michigan Constitution. Although 753,759 Michigan voters had signed the initiative, Viviano wrote, "[t]he failure to include the spaces presents the amendment in a manner difficult to read and comprehend. Thus, it may have the right words in the right order—as the majority here suggests—but the lack of critical word spaces renders the remaining text much more difficult to read and comprehend, and therefore something less than the 'full text' required by the Constitution and statutes."

References

Living people
Hillsdale College alumni
Justices of the Michigan Supreme Court
University of Michigan Law School alumni
People from Sterling Heights, Michigan
Michigan Republicans
21st-century American judges
1971 births